Below is the list of populated places in Burdur Province, Turkey by the districts. In the following lists first place in each list is the administrative center of the district.

Burdur

	Burdur
	Aksu, Burdur
	Akyaka, Burdur
	Akyayla, Burdur
	Askeriye, Burdur
	Aşağı Müslümler, Burdur
	Aziziye, Burdur
	Başmakçı, Burdur
	Bayındır, Burdur
	Bereket, Burdur
	Beşkavak, Burdur
	Boğaziçi, Burdur
	Bozlar, Burdur
	Büğdüz, Burdur
	Cimbilli, Burdur
	Çallıca, Burdur
	Çatağıl, Burdur
	Çendik, Burdur
	Çine, Burdur
	Düğer, Burdur
	Erikli, Burdur
	Gökçebağ, Burdur
	Günalan, Burdur
	Güneyyayla, Burdur
	Hacılar, Burdur
	Halıcılar, Burdur
	İğdeli, Burdur
	İlyas, Burdur
	Kapaklı, Burdur
	Karacaören, Burdur
	Karaçal, Burdur
	Karakent, Burdur
	Kartalpınar, Burdur
	Kavacık, Burdur
	Kayaaltı, Burdur
	Kayış, Burdur
	Kocapınar, Burdur
	Kozluca, Burdur
	Kökez, Burdur
	Kumluca, Burdur
	Kuruçay, Burdur
	Sarıova, Burdur
	Soğanlı, Burdur
	Suludere, Burdur
	Taşkapı, Burdur
	Ulupınar, Burdur
	Yakaköy, Burdur
	Yarıköy, Burdur
	Yassıgüme, Burdur
	Yaylabeli, Burdur
	Yazıköy, Burdur
	Yeşildağ, Burdur

Ağlasun

	Ağlasun
	Aşağıyumrutaş, Ağlasun
	Çamlıdere, Ağlasun
	Dereköy, Ağlasun
	Hisar, Ağlasun
	Kiprit, Ağlasun
	Mamak, Ağlasun
	Yazır, Ağlasun
	Yeşilbaşköy, Ağlasun
	Yumrutaş, Ağlasun

Altınyayla

	Altınyayla
	Asmabağ, Altınyayla
	Ballık, Altınyayla
	Çatak, Altınyayla
	Çörten, Altınyayla
	Kızılyaka, Altınyayla

Bucak

	Bucak
	Alkaya, Bucak
	Avdancık, Bucak
	Belören, Bucak
	Beşkonak, Bucak
	Boğazköy, Bucak
	Çamlık, Bucak
	Çobanpınarı, Bucak
	Dağarcık, Bucak
	Demirli, Bucak
	Dutalanı, Bucak
	Elsazı, Bucak
	Gündoğdu, Bucak
	Heybeli, Bucak
	İncirdere, Bucak
	Karaaliler, Bucak
	Karacaören, Bucak
	Karaot, Bucak
	Karapınar, Bucak
	Karaseki, Bucak
	Kargı, Bucak
	Kavacık, Bucak
	Keçili, Bucak
	Kestel, Bucak
	Kızılcaağaç, Bucak
	Kızılkaya, Bucak
	Kızıllı, Bucak
	Kızılseki, Bucak
	Kocaaliler, Bucak
	Kuşbaba, Bucak
	Kuyubaşı, Bucak
	Seydiköy, Bucak
	Susuz, Bucak
	Taşyayla, Bucak
	Uğurlu, Bucak
	Ürkütlü, Bucak
	Üzümlübel, Bucak
	Yuva, Bucak
	Yüreğil, Bucak

Çavdır
	Çavdır
	Anbarcık, Çavdır
	Bayır, Çavdır
	Bölmepınar, Çavdır
	Büyükalan, Çavdır
	İshakköy, Çavdır
	Karaköy, Çavdır
	Kayacık, Çavdır
	Kızıllar, Çavdır
	Kozağacı, Çavdır
	Küçükalan, Çavdır
	Söğüt, Çavdır
	Yazır, Çavdır

Çeltikçi

	Çeltikçi
       Bağsaray, Çeltikçi
	Çebiş, Çeltikçi
	Güvenli, Çeltikçi
	Kuzköy, Çeltikçi
	Ovacık, Çeltikçi
	Tekkeköy, Çeltikçi

Gölhisar
	Gölhisar		
	Asmalı, Gölhisar		
	Çamköy, Gölhisar		
	Elmalıyurt, Gölhisar		
	Evciler, Gölhisar		
	Hisarardı, Gölhisar		
	İbecik, Gölhisar		
	Karapınar, Gölhisar		
	Kargalı, Gölhisar		
	Sorkun, Gölhisar		
	Uylupınar, Gölhisar		
	Yamadı, Gölhisar		
	Yeşildere, Gölhisar		
	Yusufça, Gölhisar

Karamanlı
	Karamanlı
	Bademli, Karamanlı
	Dereköy, Karamanlı
	Kağılcık, Karamanlı
	Kayalı, Karamanlı
	Kılavuzlar, Karamanlı
	Kılçan, Karamanlı
	Manca, Karamanlı
	Mürseller, Karamanlı

Kemer

	Kemer
	Akçaören, Kemer
	Akören, Kemer
	Belenli, Kemer
	Elmacık, Kemer
	Kayı, Kemer
	Pınarbaşı, Kemer
	Yakalar, Kemer

Tefenni

	Tefenni
	Başpınar, Tefenni
	Bayramlar, Tefenni
	Belkaya, Tefenni
	Beyköy, Tefenni
	Çaylı, Tefenni
	Ece, Tefenni
	Hasanpaşa, Tefenni
	Karamusa, Tefenni
	Sazak, Tefenni
	Seydiler, Tefenni
	Yaylaköy, Tefenni
	Yeşilköy, Tefenni
	Yuva, Tefenni
	Yuvalak, Tefenni

Yeşilova

	Yeşilova
	Akçaköy, Yeşilova
	Alanköy, Yeşilova
	Armut, Yeşilova
	Aşağı Kırlı, Yeşilova
	Başkuyu, Yeşilova
	Bayındır, Yeşilova
	Bayırbaşı, Yeşilova
	Bedirli, Yeşilova
	Beyköy, Yeşilova
	Büyükyaka, Yeşilova
	Çaltepe, Yeşilova
	Çardak, Yeşilova
	Çeltek, Yeşilova
	Çuvallı, Yeşilova
	Dereköy, Yeşilova
	Doğanbaba, Yeşilova
	Düden, Yeşilova
	Elden, Yeşilova
	Gençali, Yeşilova
	Gökçeyaka, Yeşilova
	Güney, Yeşilova
	Harmanlı, Yeşilova
	Horozköy, Yeşilova
	Işıklar, Yeşilova
	İğdir, Yeşilova
	Karaköy, Yeşilova
	Karatlı, Yeşilova
	Kavak, Yeşilova
	Kayadibi, Yeşilova
	Niyazlar, Yeşilova
	Onacak, Yeşilova
	Orhanlı, Yeşilova
	Örencik, Yeşilova
	Salda, Yeşilova
	Sazak, Yeşilova
	Taşpınar, Yeşilova
	Yarışlı, Yeşilova
	Yukarı Kırlı, Yeşilova

References

List
Burdur
Mediterranean Region, Turkey